Benito Bollati (14 March 1926 – 24 January 2023) was an Italian lawyer and politician. A member of the Italian Social Movement, he served in the Chamber of Deputies from 1974 to 1979.

Bollati died in Milan on 24 January 2023, at the age of 96.

References

1926 births
2023 deaths
Italian Social Movement politicians
Deputies of Legislature VI of Italy
Deputies of Legislature VII of Italy
University of Milan alumni
Italian lawyers
People from the Province of Milan